Handball at the 2011 All-Africa Games was held from September 6–16, 2011 at several venues.

Events

Schedule

Medal summary

Medal table

Final standings

References

 
Handball at the African Games
All-Africa Games
2011 in African handball